Josephine Knur is a former Australian actress recognised for her role as Lorelei Wilkinson in television soap opera Number 96 in 1974.

Career 
Knur initially worked in the wardrobe department of Crawford Productions, while taking extra and acting jobs in series Ryan and Bellbird, and appearing in TV commercials. She then resigned from the wardrobe department to devote her time to pursuing an acting career full-time, starting with training at the Crawford's acting school.

Knur's attractive appearance led to an offer to appear in a decorative, semi-nude role in sex comedy film Alvin Purple, which Knur rejected as it contained no real acting.

During 1974 Knur acted in three episodes of police drama Division 4 each time as a different character. In mid 1974 Knur joined the cast of top rated soap opera Number 96 as vivacious dumb-blonde waitress Lorelei Wilkinson, and outfitted in costumes to enhance her physical attractiveness. A comedy character, Lorelei tried to increase her vocabulary by learning a word a day from the dictionary, then incorporating the word into her daily conversation.

Knur accepted the requirement to appear nude in Number 96, reasoning the role "gives me a chance to act and be seen acting".

Knur was a regular cast member of Number 96 for eight months. In the series her character Lorelei was killed off in November 1974 when she became the first on-screen victim of the Pantyhose Murderer.

Knur was then cast in new soap opera The Unisexers that was created by the Number 96 producers, Cash Harmon Television. The series debuted 7 February 1975 and Knur played original regular character Sally Pickles.

The Unisexers proved to be a ratings disaster that was cancelled and taken off air after only three weeks and 15 half-hour episodes.

In 1975 it was reported that Knur and another former Number 96 actor, Pamela Garrick, had made plans to leave Sydney together due to the lack of acting offers, and to work in the Philippines.
 
Knur had no further film or television acting credits after The Unisexers.

External links

Notes

Living people
Australian soap opera actresses
20th-century Australian actresses
21st-century Australian women
21st-century Australian people
Year of birth missing (living people)